Cyphostemma currorii is a succulent tree belonging to the family Vitaceae, also known as Koba or Butter-tree. They grow and reach a height of 6 meters or more. Cyphostemma currorii is found in hot, arid rocky places, and has been seen from southern Angola to Namibia and is common on the Brandberg.

Description 
Cyphostemma currorii looks like a big succulent that grows up to be a tree, belonging to the Vitaceae family. Cyphostemma currorii grows up to be a tree, with creamy, papery peeling bark. The trunk has a yellowish to orange bark, peeling off in a paper-like flakes to expose a greenish underbark. They have very long trunks, they have mid vein with branches. The leaves are at the tip of the branches, arranged in groups of threes. The leaves are fairly large and fleshy, the edges of the leaves are not smooth, they are dentated. The leaves are dentated so they can preserve water so the tree can survive the extra hot seasons.

Distribution 
Cyphostemma currorii is found in hot, arid rocky places, and has been seen from southern Angola to Namibia and is common on the Brandberg.

Use 
This tree is not used for human consumption, the foliage and fruit are rich in oxalic acid. The fruits are consumed by animals in the area. Due to its trunk ability to preserve water and be able to survive in dry, arid areas these trees are many times used as landscape decoration; ornamental pieces.

Taxonomy 
This species was named after Andrew B. Curror, a Royal Navy surgeon, from the vessel HMS Waterwitch, who first collected specimens of the tree at Elephant's Bay in Angola in the 1840s - the genus Curroria Planch. is also after him. The foliage and fruit of this genus are rich in oxalic acid, so that the leaves are shunned by browsers, though the fruit is relished by baboons and monkeys.

References

Sources
 Damaraland Flora - Christine Marais, Patricia Craven (Gamsberg McMillan 1992) Caudiciforms

currorii
Trees of South Africa
Trees of Angola
Flora of Namibia
Plants described in 1849
Caudiciform plants